HMS Hyperion was an H-class destroyer built for the Royal Navy during the mid-1930s. During the Spanish Civil War of 1936–1939, the ship enforced the arms blockade imposed by Britain and France on both sides as part of the Mediterranean Fleet. During the first few months of World War II, Hyperion searched for German commerce raiders in the Atlantic Ocean and blockaded German merchant ships in neutral harbours until she returned to the British Isles in early 1940. The ship participated in the Norwegian Campaign before she was transferred back to the Mediterranean Fleet shortly afterwards. Hyperion participated in the Battle of Calabria and the Battle of Cape Spada in July 1940 while escorting the larger ships of the fleet. The ship covered several convoys to Malta before she struck a mine and was deliberately scuttled in December 1940.

Description

The other G- and H-class destroyers were built with three Admiralty 3-drum water-tube boilers, but as a trial Hyperion uniquely used a Johnson boiler in the aft position instead. This is an O-type boiler with a single lower water drum and curved tubes, rather than the triangular arrangement with two drums used by the Admiralty. The first boiler design suffered from poor circulation and so external cold downcomers were added, making the reworked boiler 10% heavier. The boiler was well-regarded in service as it reduced the amount of potentially troublesome refractory firebrick usually used for the base of the furnace.

The ship's complement was 137 officers and men in peacetime, but this increased to 146 in wartime.

The ship mounted four 45-calibre 4.7-inch Mk IX guns in single mounts. For anti-aircraft (AA) defence, Hyperion had two quadruple Mark I mounts for the 0.5 inch Vickers Mk III machine gun. She was fitted with two above-water quadruple torpedo tube mounts for  torpedoes. One depth charge rail and two throwers were fitted; 20 depth charges were originally carried, but this increased to 35 shortly after the war began. The ship's anti-aircraft armament was increased when the rear set of torpedo tubes was replaced by a 12-pounder 12 cwt AA gun, although when exactly the modification was made is not known.

Career
Ordered on 13 December 1934, Hyperion was laid down by Swan Hunter & Wigham Richardson at Wallsend-on-Tyne, England, on 27 March 1935. She was launched on 8 April 1936 and completed on 3 December 1936. Excluding government-furnished equipment like the armament, the ship cost £251,466. She was assigned to the 2nd Destroyer Flotilla of the Mediterranean Fleet upon commissioning. Hyperion patrolled Spanish waters during the Spanish Civil War enforcing the policies of the Non-Intervention Committee. The ship received an overhaul at Malta between 30 September and 30 October 1937 and resumed patrolling Spanish waters for the rest of the war. Hyperion was sent to Portsmouth for another refit in August 1939 that lasted from 16 to 27 August.

When World War II began on 3 September, the ship was en route to Freetown, Sierra Leone, to search for German commerce raiders. Hyperion was transferred to the North America and West Indies Station in late October where he blockaded various German merchant ships in American and Mexican harbours. Hyperion was transferred to the British Isles in mid-January 1940 and began a refit at Portsmouth that lasted from 25 January to 6 March. The ship rejoined the 2nd Destroyer Flotilla of the Home Fleet at Scapa Flow.

On 5 April Hyperion escorted the battlecruiser  as she covered the minelayers preparing to implement Operation Wilfred, an operation to lay mines in the Vestfjord to prevent the transport of Swedish iron ore from Narvik to Germany. The ship and her sister  pretended to lay a minefield off Bud, Norway on 8 April and reported its location to the Norwegians. She remained with Ark Royal when Glorious returned to Scapa Flow to refuel on 27 April. In early May the ship escorted the light cruiser  on an unsuccessful sweep of the North Sea looking for German ships.

Hyperion evacuated British personnel from the Hook of Holland from 8 to 12 May and was then ordered to reinforce the Mediterranean Fleet at Malta on 16 May. On 9 July she participated in the Battle of Calabria as an escort for the heavy ships of Force C and unsuccessfully engaged Italian destroyers and suffered no damage. During the Battle of Cape Spada on 19 July, the ship escorted Australian light cruiser  and rescued some of the 525 survivors from the  together with the other escorting destroyers. Together with her sister  and two other destroyers, she bombarded Italian positions around Sidi Barrani on 25 September. Hyperion escorted the carrier  during the Battle of Taranto on the night of 11/12 November. With Hereward, she sank the Italian submarine Naiade on 14 December 1940 near Bardia.

Hyperion struck a mine on 22 December 1940 off Pantelleria as she escorted the battleship  on passage from Alexandria to Gibraltar while covering a convoy to Malta. The destroyer  attempted to tow Hyperion, but the tow cable broke twice and the destroyer  was ordered to sink her after Ilex took off the crew. Only two members of the crew were not rescued and were presumed killed in the explosion.

Notes

Footnotes

References
 
 
 
 
 
 

 

G and H-class destroyers of the Royal Navy
Ships built by Swan Hunter
Ships built on the River Tyne
1936 ships
World War II destroyers of the United Kingdom
World War II shipwrecks in the Mediterranean Sea
Maritime incidents in December 1940
Ships sunk by mines